Japan's  are parks or open spaces established by the Ministry of Land, Infrastructure, Transport and Tourism under the .

History
The first National Government Park, Musashi Kyūryō National Government Park, was started in 1968 to commemorate the hundredth anniversary of the Meiji Restoration. The park opened its door to the public in July, 1974.

Parks
In total there are seventeen National Government Parks, listed below in chronological order:
Musashi Kyūryō National Government Park, opened in 1974
Asuka Historical National Government Park opened in 1974 (includes also the Nara Palace Site Historical Park)
Yodogawa River National Government Park opened in 1977.
Uminonakamichi Seaside National Government Park opened in 1981.
Okinawa Commemorative National Government Park opened in 1976.
Showa Commemorative National Government Park opened in 1983.
Takino Suzuran Hillside National Government Park opened in 1983.
Hitachi Seaside Park opened in 1991
Kiso Sansen National Government Park opened in 1987
Michinoku Forest Lakeside National Government Park opened in 1989.
Bihoku Hillside National Government Park opened in 1995.
Sanuki Mannō National Government Park opened in 1998.
Echigo Hillside National Government Park opened in 1998.
Alps Azumino National Government Park opened in 2004.
Yoshinogari Historical National Government Park opened in 2001.
Akashi Kaikyō National Government Park opened in 2002.
Tokyo Waterfront Wide Area Disaster Reduction National Government Park is under construction.

External links
  National Government Parks

References

National Government Parks of Japan